Charles Romulus Ducharme (November 4, 1886 – February 15, 1976) was a politician in Quebec, Canada and an eight-term Member of the Legislative Assembly of Quebec (MLA).

Early life

He was born on November 4, 1886, near Berthierville in Lanaudière. He opened a law practice in La Tuque in the Mauricie area.

Federal politics

Ducharme ran as a Conservative candidate in the district of Portneuf in the 1921 and 1925 federal elections, but each time lost to Liberal Party of Canada incumbent Michel-Siméon Delisle.

Member of the legislature

He ran as an Action libérale nationale candidate in the district of Laviolette in the 1935 provincial election and defeated Liberal Party of Quebec incumbent Joseph-Alphida Crête. He became a member of the Union Nationale and was re-elected as such in the 1936 election.

He lost the 1939 election to Liberal Edmond Guibord.

However, he won his seat back in the 1944 election and won every subsequent election in 1948, 1952, 1956, 1960 and 1962.

He served as Parliamentary Assistant to the Minister of Municipal Affairs from 1956 to 1960.

Ducharme did not run for re-election in the 1966 election.

Death

He died on February 15, 1976, in La Tuque.

Honours

Boulevard Ducharme, a section of Route 155 in La Tuque, was named to honour him.
Pont Couvert Ducharme, one of the two covered bridges in La Bostonnais was named after him.

See also
La Tuque, Quebec
Laviolette Provincial Electoral District
Mauricie

References

External links
 La résidence de ROMULUS DUCHARME en 1948 

1886 births
1976 deaths
Action libérale nationale MNAs
Conservative Party of Canada (1867–1942) candidates for the Canadian House of Commons
Union Nationale (Quebec) MNAs